The Korea Minting, Security Printing and ID Card Operating Corporation (KOMSCO; Korean: 한국조폐공사) is a state-owned corporation which is responsible to print and mint the banknotes and coins and other government documents. Its headquarters are located in Daejeon, South Korea.

Products
The main job of KOMSCO is printing and minting the South Korean currency. Currently the 1000, 5000, 10,000, 50,000 KRW banknotes and the 1, 5, 10, 50, 100, 500 KRW coins are minted and printed by the currency plant of KOMSCO. Also, they produce all South Korean cheques, stamps, and passports.
KOMSCO currently produces four bullion coin series; Komsco Tiger series, Chiwoo Cheonwang, Zi:Sin, and the K Series.

External links
  KOMSCO official site

Finance in South Korea
Government-owned companies of South Korea
Mints (currency)
Banknote printing companies
South Korean companies established in 1951
Manufacturing companies established in 1951
Companies based in Daejeon